Enotogenes exiguus is a species of beetle in the family Cerambycidae, and the only species in the genus Enotogenes. It was described by Heller in 1917.

References

Enicodini
Beetles described in 1917